Michal Valent (born 5 March 1986) is a Slovak professional ice hockey goaltender who currently playing for MHk 32 Liptovský Mikuláš of the Slovak Extraliga. 

He was selected by the Buffalo Sabres in the 5th round (145th overall) of the 2004 NHL Entry Draft. Valent played for BK Mladá Boleslav from the 2010–11 Czech Extraliga season until October 2014. He had previously played for HC Sparta Prague.

Career
After joining Mladá Boleslav he spent much of the first two seasons as back-up to local born goalie Marek Schwarz. Schwarz then left the club and Jaroslav Hübl came in to take his place. Valent, therefore, remained second choice for the majority of the 2010–11 season. At the end of that season the club was relegated to the Czech První Liga, the second highest Czech league, in 2012 he remained with the club and was initially set to form a partnership with new signing Vlastimil Lakosil, but junior goaltender Roman Will was given a place in the team when he unexpectedly returned from Canada, leaving Valent's position uncertain. For that reason he was loaned out to other teams including HK Nitra in his native Slovakia. Lakosil failed to impress, but youngster Will proved extremely capable and secured the number one spot. When Will was unable to play due to illness, Valent was recalled from Nitra early. He subsequently built a solid position in the club and the Will-Valent partnership excelled. Lakosil would eventually leave the club to play in Kazakhstan. By the time the club won promotion back into the Extraliga at the end of the 2013-14 season, Valent had cemented his place as the team's first choice goaltender and signed a contract with the club for the following season.

With Will heading to the US at the beginning of the 2014-15 season however, newcomer David Rittich was handed the reigns as the team's number one goal tender leaving Valent once again as back-up. He made two starts earning an 0-1-1 record, as well as twice coming in to replace Rittich part way through a game in the first 12 games of the season. In early October the club signed veteran goalie Roman Málek on loan from HC Vítkovice Steel on loan until the end of the season, leading to speculation that there may have been some tension between Valent and Rittich, or that Valent was clearly unhappy as number two behind the rookie, though there has not been any clear evidence of this. Málek's arrival, however, further complicated the goal-tending situation and it was unlikely that the three could all get a chance to play. Finally, on October 16, 2014 it was announced that Valent would shortly be leaving the club  and returning to his native Slovakia to join HK Nitra, one of the clubs he represented while on loan from Mladá Boleslav in the 2012-13 season. In the 2014–15 season Nitra reached the play-off semi-finals and during the off-season Valent signed a contract to remain at the club for another season.

On December 19, 2015, Valent made his debut for the Slovakian national team at the Arosa Challenge in Switzerland. Facing the home team, Slovakia eventually succumbed by a score of 3-2 after a shootout.

On April 22, 2016, Valent's current team HK Nitra became champion of the Slovak Extraliga, beating Banská Bystrica in 6 games.

Awards and honors

References

External links

1986 births
HC Sparta Praha players
HC Berounští Medvědi players
Omaha Lancers players
SK Horácká Slavia Třebíč players
AZ Havířov players
BK Mladá Boleslav players
HC Vrchlabí players
HC Most players
HK Nitra players
HK Dukla Trenčín players
Buffalo Sabres draft picks
Living people
Slovak ice hockey goaltenders
Sportspeople from Martin, Slovakia
MHk 32 Liptovský Mikuláš players
Slovak expatriate ice hockey players in the Czech Republic
Slovak expatriate ice hockey players in the United States